The 2009 European Cross Country Championships was a continental cross country running competition that was held on 13 December 2009 near Dublin city, Fingal in Ireland. Dublin was selected as the host city in 2007 and the event was the first time that a major European athletics championships took place in Ireland. The six men's and women's races in the championship programme took place in Santry Demense on a looped course with flat and grassy ground. The 16th edition of the European Cross Country Championships featured 323 athletes from 30 nations.

Alemayehu Bezabeh upset the defending champion (Serhiy Lebid) to win the men's senior race: it was his first medal at a major international competition and he was the first Spanish runner to win in the history of the championships. In the women's senior competition, Hayley Yelling was a surprise winner, having come out of her competitive retirement just weeks before the race. The much favoured Portuguese team (which included Jessica Augusto and Inês Monteiro) did not reach the individual podium but they took the gold in the team competition.

Noureddine Smaïl and Hassan Chahdi took gold and silver in the men's under-23 competition, leading the French to a team victory. Jeroen D'Hoedt was the winner of the men's junior race. Sultan Haydar won the women's under-23 race while Karoline Bjerkeli Grøvdal added to her junior honours with a gold in the women's junior race, becoming the first Norwegian gold medallist of the championships' history.

Almost 7000 spectators attended the championships and, in Europe, it was broadcast live on television for free by RTÉ, the Irish state broadcaster.

Bidding

Ireland's bid for the competition was first discussed in 2006 when Liam Hennessy, president of Athletics Ireland, proposed the idea at the European Athletics conference that year. After the proposal had gained the support of the Athletics Ireland board, Fingal County Council and the Irish Sports Council, the state broadcaster (RTÉ) agreed to show the event live on television for free across Europe.

The bidding process concluded in October 2007 at a presentation to the European Athletics Association in Malta.  The Irish bid to host the championships was led by Mary Coghlan (Chair of Finance & Risk AAI), Senan Turnbull (Fingal Council's director of community, culture and sports), Liam Hennessy (President of AAI), Paddy Marlay (Competition Committee of AAI) and beat proposals from France and Poland. Ireland had hosted the World Cross Country Championships in 1979 and 2002, but this was the first time that Ireland had ever hosted a major European athletics competition.

Course

The course was situated in Santry Demense Park adjacent the national track and field stadium, Morton Stadium, which is the home stadium for Clonliffe Harriers – the oldest athletics club in Ireland. The course's looped design allowed for races of varying lengths through the use of laps. The four race lengths were:  for the senior men's race,  for the senior women's and men's under-23 competitions,  for the under-23 women and junior men, and finally  for the women's junior race. The ground of the course was grassy throughout and, while it did contain some slight dips and uphills, it did not feature any severe obstacles or inclines.

Competition
Prior to the championships, eight-time gold medal winner Serhiy Lebid was the favourite for the men's race, with Great Britain's Mo Farah representing the greatest challenge to him. For the women's race, reigning champion Hilda Kibet had decided not to compete. This left the women's senior competition without a clear favourite: Portugal's Jessica Augusto and Inês Monteiro, along with former champions Hayley Yelling and Tetyana Holovchenko, comprised the likely medallists, while Mary Cullen was the home favourite.

On the day of the race, an estimated 7000 spectators were in attendance and a total of 323 athletes represented 30 European nations. Although the championships only accepts athletes who are citizens of European countries, African-born athletes were highly represented among those who reached the podium: Ethiopian-born runners Alemayehu Bezabeh and Sultan Haydar Sultan, and Algerian-born Noureddine Smaïl all took gold medals, while Atelaw Yeshetela and Somalian-born athlete Mo Farah won minor medals.

Men's race
There was a slow start to the men's senior race, with a large leading pack reaching the 2.5 km mark. However, soon after that point, Mo Farah made clear his intention to win the race, increasing the pace and accelerating away from the pack. He remained the leader for the first half of the race, with Alemayehu Bezabeh following closely and Lebid a little further behind. Bezabeh, competing in only his second European championships, overtook Farah in the fourth lap and began to create a lead for himself. Farah made ground on the leader in the final lap, but he tired towards the end. Bezabeh went on to win his first major title, becoming the first Spaniard to win the championships.

Coming in second place, Farah collapsed after the finish line and missed the medal ceremony as he received medical assistance. Although ahead of the rest of the pack, Lebid was a clear third and was some way off the two frontrunners – an injury two weeks prior to the race had affected his preparations and he was pleased to receive the bronze medal. Spanish runners Sergio Sánchez and Ayad Lamdassem took fourth and fifth places, all but guaranteeing Spain the men's team gold medal.

Women's race
The women's senior race also had an unexpected winner: Hayley Yelling of Great Britain (the 2004 championships winner) had retired from athletics after a poor showing at the 2008 European Cross Country Championships, but she returned to competition in December 2009 with a win at the British selection race for that year's race.

Yelling started with a quick pace, rapidly building up a lead over the pack of runners in the early stages of the race. During the second lap, the Portuguese runners, along with Rosa María Morató and Adriënne Herzog, remained in pursuit but Ireland's Mary Cullen had faded behind. Yelling, still leading, maintained her fast speed after the halfway point while Augusto and Morató filled out the medalling positions. Morató pulled away from Augusto, but never managed to make up the six-second gap between her and Yelling. The Briton took the gold medal and Morató was next to come in, receiving the silver medal. Meanwhile, Herzog overtook a tired Jessica Augusto for the bronze. Augusto, Monteiro, and Ana Dulce Félix of Portugal filled out the top six finishers; although they had failed to reach the individual podium, the trio and tenth-placed Sara Moreira won the team gold medals by a significant margin.

Under-23 and junior races
In the men's under-23 race, there was a large group of runners at the front up until the 3.5 km mark, at which point a pack of three runners led the race throughout: Atelaw Yeshetela of Belgium, and Hassan Chahdi and Noureddine Smaïl of France. The three took turns in leading the race and remained close. However, in the final lap, Smaïl broke away from the other two runners and was unchallenged at the finish line, proving his abilities after a disappointing race in 2008. Chahdi was the silver medallist and Yeshetela took third place, while Frenchman Florian Carvalho was fourth, setting up France as the team gold medallists of the race. Great Britain and Belgium took the team silver and bronze respectively.

As she had done in the previous year's competition, Sultan Haydar of Turkey took the lead early on in the women's under-23 competition. By the halfway mark she was thirteen seconds clear of the other runners, but her pace started to slow. Irina Sergeyeva quickly reduced the Turkish runner's lead and on the final lap she threatened to take first place. However, Sergeyeva was beaten by Haydar's sprint finish in the final home straight. Jessica Sparke took the bronze, and her teammates Charlotte Browning and Hollie Rowland followed shortly after to continue Great Britain's unbeaten run of gold medals in the women's under-23 team competition.

In the junior races, Karoline Bjerkeli Grøvdal became the first Norwegian to win at the European Championships. The European Junior Champion quickly took control of the women's race and managed to hold off Gulshat Fazlitdinova to win the title. Kate Avery was the bronze medallist in the individual race, and Russia, Great Britain and Germany were the team medallists. Grøvdal's compatriot Sondre Nordstad Moen failed to make it a junior double for Norway in the men's race. Moen led the race for the first three laps with a comfortable pace, but Jeroen D'Hoedt pulled ahead for the final lap. Nick Goolab made up significant ground to pip teammate James Wilkinson for the silver at the finish line. Moen ended up fourth, but he won a team bronze with Norway. Britain and France won the gold and silver team medals, respectively.

Race results

Men's senior

Note: Scores are calculated by combining the finishing positions of a country's top four athletes. The country with the lowest cumulative score wins.
Totals: 67 entrants, 65 starters, 62 finishers, 10 teams

Women's senior

Totals: 53 entrants, 51 starters, 50 finishers, 8 teams

Men's under-23

Totals: 82 entrants, 81 starters, 75 finishers, 11 teams

Women's under-23

Totals: 61 entrants, 61 starters, 59 finishers, 8 teams

Men's junior

Totals: 89 entrants, 89 starters, 88 finishers, 15 teams

Women's junior

Totals: 76 entrants, 76 starters, 76 finishers, 11 teams

Total medal table

Note: Totals include both individual and team medals, with medals in the team competition counting as one medal.

References
General
Results – Senior Men. European Athletics (2009-12-13). Retrieved 2009-12-16.
Results – Senior Women. European Athletics (2009-12-13). Retrieved 2009-12-17.
Results – Under 23 Men. European Athletics (2009-12-13). Retrieved 2009-12-17.
Results – Under 23 Women. European Athletics (2009-12-13). Retrieved 2009-12-17.
Results – Junior Men. European Athletics (2009-12-13). Retrieved 2009-12-17.
Results – Junior Women. European Athletics (2009-12-13). Retrieved 2009-12-17.
Specific

External links
Official website
European Athletics website

European Cross Country Championships
European Cross Country Championships
Athletics in Fingal
Cross country running in Ireland
2009 in Irish sport
December 2009 sports events in Europe
International athletics competitions hosted by Ireland